Guglielmo Gratarolo or Grataroli or Guilelmus Gratarolus (16 May 1516, Bergamo – 16 April 1568, Basel) was an Italian doctor and alchemist.

Biography 

Gratorolo studied in Padua and Venice.

A Calvinist, Gratarolo sought refuge in Graubünden, Strasbourg, and finally settled in Basel in 1552. There, he taught medicine and edited a number works, particularly alchemical ones, notable among them the 1561 collection  published by the printer Henricus Petrus, and reprinted in 1572.

relied heavily on the earlier printed alchemical collection De Alchemia and was in turn heavily relied upon for the Theatrum Chemicum. Gratorolo omitted only the Tabula Smaragdina and Ortulanus' commentary on it from volume 1; these had been published separately a year earlier in 1560, although falsely attributed to Johannes de Garlandia. Above all, Gratorolo wanted to publish the works of Pseudo-Lull and Pseudo-Geber. The contents of the 1561 edition are as follows:.

Volume 1:
 Chrysorrhoas, sive De Arte Chymica Dialogus
 Giovanni Bracesco, Dialogus Ioannis Braccschi, cui titulus est Lignum vitae, in quo etiam Gebri Philosophi expositio succincta continentur
 In eundem Braceschuni Gebri interpretem, animadversio, authore loanne Tauladano
 Pseudo-Geber, De investigatione perfectionis
 Pseudo-Geber, Summa perfectionis
 Pseudo-Geber, De inventione veritatis sive perfectionis
 Pseudo-Geber, Liber Fornacum
 Roger Bacon, Rogerii Bachonis De Alchemia libellus cui titulum fecit. Speculum Alchemiae
 Richardus Anglicus, Richardi Anglici Libellus peri Chemeias, cui titulum fecit, Correctorium
 Rosarius minor
 Khalid ibn Yazid, Liber Secretorum Alchemiae compositus per Calid, filium Iazichi
 

Volume 2:
 Liber de Magni lapidis Compositione et Operatione, Authore adhuc incerto
 Sententia Ioannis Baptistae Montani, de sublimatione
 Pseudo-Arnaldus de Villa Nova, Rosarius philosophorum Arnaldi de Villanova
 Novum lumen eiusdem vel alterius
 Pseudo-Arnaldus de Villa Nova, Epistola Magistri Arnaldi de Villa nova super Alchymiam ad regem Neapolitanum
 
 Pseudo-Arnaldus de Villa Nova, Practica Magistri Arnaldi de Villanova, ad quendam Papam, ex libro dicto, Breviarius librorum Alchymiae
 Pseudo-Albertus Magnus Alberti Magni Ratisponensis episcopi de Alchymia liber integerrimus
 Pseudo-Albertus Magnus, Scriptum Alberti super Arborem Aristotelis
 Pseudo-Lull, Apertorium Raymundi Lullii De veri lapidis compositione
 Pseudo-Lull, 
 Pseudo-Lull, Practica ejusdem
 Pseudo-Lull, Idem de intentione Alchimistarum
 Pseudo-Lull, Ejusdem Summaria Lapidis Consideratio et eius abbreviationes
 Pseudo-Lull, Ejusdem Libellus utilissimus de Mercurio solo
 Liber experimentorum
 Pulcherrimum opus de transmutatione metallorum
 Capitulum valde magnum in albedine, & omnibus nobilius, ex libro qui dicitur Philosophus mirabilis
 Liber Mercuriorum Raymundi Lullii
 Intentio summaria, quae aliter dicitur Repertorium, valde utilis ad intelligentiam Testamenti, Codicilli & aliorum librorum Raymundi Lullii
 Aristotelis de Perfecto Magisterio exquisitum & integerrimum opus, &c.
 Libellus duodecim aquarum, ex libro Emanuelis
 Aquae rubeae Avicennas ad tingendum quatuor spiritus sublimatos albos
 Elixiriorum varia compositio & modus
 John of Rupescissa, Joannis de Rupescissa liber de confectione ver Lapidis Philosophorum
 Johannes Ferrarius, De lapide Philosophorum secundum verum modum formando Efferarii monachi
 Thesaurus Philosophiae
 Pseudo-Lull, Praxis universalis Magni operis, ex Raymundo
 De lapidis philosophorum formatione epilogus
 Practica Magistri Odomari ad discipulum
 Arcanum Philosophorum, ut ex Saturno facias aurum perfectum
 Perfecta Salis communis praeparatio ad lapidem philosophorum
 Historiola Antiqua de Argento in aurum verso
 Tractatus de Marchasita, ex qua fit Elixir ad album verissimum
 
 Quaestio an Lapis philosophicus valcat contra pestem,;
 
 Practica Caravantis Hispani Lapidis Philosophici Nomenclaturae, & Gulielmo Gratarolo collectae Giovanni Aurelio Augurello, Ioannis Aurelii Augurelli Chrysopoeiae libri iii., et Geronticon Liber i Regimina Artis Works 
 De Memoria Reparanda, Augenda, Servandaque. Andream Gesner. F. & Rodolphum Vuyssenbachium, 1553; Reprint by Kessinger Publishing, 2009. 
 Regimen omnium iter agentium. 1556. 
  Basel: Heinrich Petri et Pietro Perna, 1561. 
 Pestis descriptio, causa signa omnigena et praeservatio. Paris: Federicus Morellus, 1561. on gallica
 Regimen omnium iter agentium, postremo editum. Wendelinum Rihelium, 1563.

 Bibliography 
 
 Maclean, Ian. "Heterodoxy in Natural Philosophy and Medicine: Pietro Pomponazzi, Guglielmo Gratarolo, Girolamo Cardano," in Heterodoxy in Early Modern Science and Religion'', edited by John Brooke and Ian Maclean. Oxford: Oxford University Press, 2005.

References

1516 births
1568 deaths
16th-century alchemists
16th-century Italian physicians
Italian alchemists